Dynatrace, Inc. is a global technology company listed on the NYSE that provides a software intelligence platform based on artificial intelligence (AI) and automation. Dynatrace technologies are used to monitor and optimize application performance, software development and security practices, IT infrastructure, and user experience for businesses and government agencies throughout the world.

The Dynatrace Software Intelligence Platform uses a proprietary form of AI called Davis to discover, map, and monitor applications, microservices, container orchestration platforms such as Kubernetes, and IT infrastructure running in multicloud, hybrid-cloud, and hyperscale network environments. The platform also provides automated problem remediation. The Dynatrace platform provides observability of the full solution stack in order to simplify the complexity of cloud native computing and accelerate an organization's digital transformation and cloud migration.

Product 
The Dynatrace Software Intelligence Platform uses AI to provide infrastructure monitoring, applications and microservices monitoring, application security, digital experience, business analytics, and cloud automation capabilities. Dynatrace also provides a Software Intelligence Hub that publishes integrations with more than 620 technologies including Amazon Web Services (AWS), Docker, Java, and Prometheus. 

The Dynatrace platform consists of the following technologies: 

 OneAgent for automated data collection
 Smartscape for continuously updated topology mapping and visualization
 PurePath for code-level distributed tracing
 Grail data lakehouse with indexless, schema-on-read storage for contextual data analytics and management using massively parallel processing and the proprietary Dynatrace query language (DQL)
 Davis, a proprietary causal-AI engine, for automatic root-cause fault-tree analysis 

Dynatrace provides multicloud observability to both SaaS and managed service deployment models, in partnership with service providers including Amazon Web Services, Microsoft Azure, Google Cloud Platform, among others.

Open source contributions 
Dynatrace invests in building DevOps and SRE automation and contributes developments to the Cloud Native Computing Foundation (CNCF), including the contribution of Keptn, an open-source pluggable control plane for cloud-native application lifecycle orchestration. Dynatrace is a key contributor and investor in open-source community activities around observability and performance. Examples include W3C Trace Context, of which Dynatrace is a founding member and co-chair;  OpenTelemetry; and OpenFeature. Other open-source technologies Dynatrace contributes to include MONACO, Barista, and Dynahist.

The Dynatrace REST API can be used to retrieve or ingest data.

History 
Dynatrace was founded by Bernd Greifeneder on February 2, 2005 in Linz, Austria as dynaTrace Software GmbH, and was acquired by Compuware in 2011. In 2014, the private equity firm Thoma Bravo took the company private, and the Compuware APM group was renamed Dynatrace. Dynatrace established the Digital Performance Management category in late 2014.

On August 1, 2019, Dynatrace completed its initial public offering.

Dynatrace headquarters is located in Waltham, Massachusetts, with research and development labs based in various locations across Austria, Estonia, Poland, Spain, and the United States. Dynatrace also hosts 60 further offices globally, including Australia, Brazil, Singapore, and the United Kingdom.

Acquisitions
Keynote Systems: In 2015, Dynatrace was merged with Keynote Systems, a rival provider of Application Performance Management (APM) services, which private equity firm Thoma Bravo had also acquired. Keynote, founded in 1995, had been an early provider of Internet performance metrics, including its "Keynote perspective" product in 1996, the Business 40 Internet Performance Index in 1997, and its Streaming Perspective product in 2000. 

Matrix.net (Matrix Information and Directory Services, Xaffire): Among the Keynote acquisitions which were eventually merged into Dynatrace were Xaffire Inc., whose Austin business unit Keynote acquired in December 2003, and which itself had emerged from the combination of Alignment Software Inc. with Matrix NetSystems, also known as Matrix.net and Matrix Information and Directory Services Inc. Matrix, operated by early Internet pioneer John Quarterman, was well-known for its Internet host censuses and its statistical maps and "weather reports" of the Internet.

Qumram: On November 9, 2017, Dynatrace announced the acquisition of Qumram, a company offering advanced session replay technology for mobile and web application.

SpectX: On September 14, 2021, Dynatrace completed the acquisition of high-speed parsing and query analytics company, SpectX.

Industry recognition 
In 2022 Dynatrace was awarded with 3 major awards, best place to work at 2022, best global culture 2022, best company outlook 2022.

In 2022, Gartner again named Dynatrace a Leader in its 2022 Gartner Magic Quadrant for APM and Observability. 

In 2021, Gartner named Dynatrace a Leader in 2021 Gartner Magic Quadrant APM report for the 11th consecutive time. Gartner also scored Dynatrace highest in five of six use cases in the 2021 Gartner Critical Capabilities for APM report.

GigaOm recognized Dynatrace as a "Leader" and "Outperformer" in the 2021 GigaOm Radar for AIOps solutions. 

Dynatrace named a Customers' Choice in the September 2021 Gartner Peer Insights 'Voice of the Customer': Application Performance Monitoring report. 

Dynatrace named a Leader in cloud-native observability in the 2021 ISG Provider Lens – Container Services & Solutions Report.

Forrester recognized Dynatrace as Leader in the 2020 Forrester Wave: AIOps Report. 

G2 users rated Dynatrace the No. 1 observability platform. 

The AI Breakthrough Awards recognized Dynatrace as the best overall AI-based analytics company for business intelligence and analytics. 

The Constellation Shortlist named Dynatrace as one of the top seven companies in their Shortlist for Digital Performance Management.  

Dynatrace was named a 2021 Best Large Company to Work For by Built In Boston.

References

External links 

Software companies based in Massachusetts
Companies based in Waltham, Massachusetts
Software performance management
Website monitoring software
Corporate spin-offs
2019 initial public offerings
Companies listed on the New York Stock Exchange
Software companies of the United States